Eutrechus is a genus of beetles in the family Carabidae, containing the following species:
 Eutrechus barringtonensis Moore, 1972
 Eutrechus coxi (Sloane, 1911)
 Eutrechus gippslandicus (Sloane, 1923)
 Eutrechus otwayensis (Moore, 1960)

References

Trechinae